Habroteleia mutabilis, is a species of wasp belonging to the family Platygastridae. It is described from Fiji.

Description
Female is slightly larger than male. Body length of female is about 3.60–3.74 mm, whereas male is 3.36–3.72 mm. Mesosoma blackish to orange in color. Metasoma are blackish to eorange with dark brown to black patches. Antennae scrobe foveate. Central keel absent.

References

Insects described in 2018
Scelioninae